Ahmadabad-e Difeh Khoshk (also Romanized as Aḩmadābād-e Dīfeh Khoshk; also known as Aḩmadābād and Aḩmadābād-e Da’feh) is a village in Koshkuiyeh Rural District, Koshkuiyeh District, Rafsanjan County, Kerman Province, Iran. At the 2006 census, its population was 1,518, in 392 families.

References 

Populated places in Rafsanjan County